The Phantom Gunslinger is a 1970 Mexican-American Western film directed by Albert Zugsmith. The film stars Troy Donahue, Sabrina, Elizabeth Campbell, Emilio Fernández, Germán Robles, and Pedro Armendáriz, Jr.

A digitally restored version of The Phantom Gunslinger was released in December 2013.

Plot
The town of Tucca Flats is invaded by a gang of bandits, including Algernon, Big Sam, and Cookie. The sheriff leaves town, naming a trainee preacher, Phil, as his successor. Bill does not know how to use a gun, and has to learn.

Cast
Troy Donahue as Phil Phillips
Sabrina as Margie
Elizabeth Campbell as Cookie
Emilio Fernández as Sheriff
Carlos Rivas as Sam
Germán Robles as The Devil
Pedro Armendáriz, Jr. as Algernon

Production
The film was shot in March 1967 in Churubusco Studios in Mexico City.

It was not released until 1970.

See also
 List of American films of 1970

References

External links
 
The Phantom Gunslinger at American Genre Film
The Phantom Gunslinger at Letterbox DVD
The Phantom Gunslinger at BFI

1970 films
Mexican comedy films
English-language Mexican films
1970s Western (genre) comedy films
Films shot in Mexico City
American Western (genre) comedy films
Films directed by Albert Zugsmith
1970s American films
1970s Mexican films